Crossothamnus is a genus of South American flowering plants in the family Asteraceae.

 Species
 Crossothamnus gentryi R.M.King & H.Rob. - Peru, Ecuador
 Crossothamnus killipii (R.M.King & H.Rob.) R.M.King & H.Rob. - Colombia
 Crossothamnus pascoanus M.O.Dillon & B.L.Turner - Peru
 Crossothamnus weberbaueri (Hieron.) R.M.King & H.Rob. - Peru

References

Eupatorieae
Asteraceae genera
Flora of South America
Taxonomy articles created by Polbot